Leavenworth Township is a township in Brown County, Minnesota, United States. The population was 336 as of the 2000 census. Leavenworth Township was organized in 1859.

Geography

The southeast half of the city of Cobden is within the township geographically but is a separate entity.

Unincorporated community
 Leavenworth at

Major highway
  U.S. Highway 14

Lake
 Altermatt Lake (vast majority)

Adjacent townships
 Prairieville Township (north)
 Home Township (northeast)
 Stark Township (east)
 Mulligan Township (south)
 Bashaw Township (southwest)
 Burnstown Township (west)
 Brookville Township, Redwood County (northwest)

Cemetery
The township includes Mielke Cemetery.

Demographics
As of the census of 2000, there were 336 people, 120 households, and 93 families residing in the township.  The population density was 9.6 people per square mile (3.7/km).  There were 125 housing units at an average density of 3.6/sq mi (1.4/km).  The racial makeup of the township was 98.81% White, 0.89% from other races, and 0.30% from two or more races. Hispanic or Latino of any race were 0.60% of the population.

There were 120 households, out of which 40.0% had children under the age of 18 living with them, 69.2% were married couples living together, 4.2% had a female householder with no husband present, and 21.7% were non-families. 20.0% of all households were made up of individuals, and 4.2% had someone living alone who was 65 years of age or older.  The average household size was 2.80 and the average family size was 3.26.

In the township the population was spread out, with 31.5% under the age of 18, 4.2% from 18 to 24, 28.6% from 25 to 44, 24.4% from 45 to 64, and 11.3% who were 65 years of age or older.  The median age was 39 years. For every 100 females, there were 138.3 males.  For every 100 females age 18 and over, there were 125.5 males.

The median income for a household in the township was $40,313, and the median income for a family was $42,500. Males had a median income of $27,321 versus $19,643 for females. The per capita income for the township was $19,796.  About 6.1% of families and 7.4% of the population were below the poverty line, including 7.4% of those under age 18 and 9.4% of those age 65 or over.

References

Sources
 United States National Atlas
 United States Census Bureau 2007 TIGER/Line Shapefiles
 United States Board on Geographic Names (GNIS)

Townships in Brown County, Minnesota
Townships in Minnesota